Worlingham is a village and civil parish in the East Suffolk district of the English county of Suffolk. At the 2011 census it had a population of 3,745; the combined population of Beccles and Worlingham is 13,868. The parish has increased in population in recent years due to the development of suburban housing areas within the built up area, going up by over 13% between the 2001 and 2011 censuses.

The Ipswich to Lowestoft railway line passes through this area, with the nearest railway station at Beccles.

Other than Beccles, the parish borders the parishes of North Cove, Mutford, Ellough and Weston. To the north the parish of Aldeby lies across the River Waveney in Norfolk. The A146 Beccles bypass, built during the 1980s, passes through the parish whilst the A145 Beccles southern relief road runs along the parish's eastern and southern borders. Parts of the Beccles Airfield site along the A145 are located within the parish; these are used for a variety of industrial uses, including the printing works of William Clowes which relocated from Beccles in the early 21st century.

Community facilities
Worlingham has a limited range of shops including a local grocery and sub-post office, hairdresser, fish and chip shop, pharmacy and small newsagent. There are a number of parks.

The local church, which is approximately 900 years old, is dedicated to All Saints. Worlingham Hall is an 18th-century country house now converted to a country house hotel.

Worlingham CofEVC Primary School serves the village and children attend Sir John Leman High School in Beccles from age 11. A community steering group has been created to bring life back into the village by giving the local children and teenagers places to go and do activities. House prices in Worlingham are some of the highest in the northern area of East Suffolk District (formerly Waveney District).

References

External links

Entry in Kelly's Directory of Cambs, Norfolk & Suffolk, 1892
Parish Council Homepage

Villages in Suffolk
Civil parishes in Suffolk
Waveney District